Rakfisk is a Norwegian fish dish made from trout or char, salted and autolyzed for two to three months, or even up to a year.  Rakfisk is then eaten without cooking and has a strong smell and a pungent salty flavor.

Origin
The first record of the term rakfisk dates back to 1348, but the history of this food is probably even older. No sources are available as to the exact invention year of the rakfisk dish or the autolysis process that produces the raw material for it.

General

Etymology
Fisk is the Norwegian word for "fish." Rak derives from the word  in Norse language, meaning "moist" or "soaked".

Preparation method
Rakfisk is made from fresh trout or char. After gutting and rinsing, the fish is placed in a bucket and salted. Small amounts of sugar may be added to speed up the autolyzation process.
The fish is then placed under pressure with a lid that fits down into the bucket and a weight on top. A brine is formed as the salt draws moisture from the fish. The rakfisk bucket is stored at under 5  degrees Celsius for one to three months.

Eating
The finished product does not need cooking and is eaten as it is. Rakfisk will traditionally be served sliced or as a fillet on flatbrød or lefse and almond potatoes. Some also use raw onion, sour cream,  mustard-sauce, a mild form of mustard with dill.

See also

 Surströmming
 Hákarl
 Lutefisk
 Gravlax
 Fermented fish
 Acquired taste

References

External links

 Rakfisk (in Norwegian)

Norwegian cuisine
Fermented fish